Yann Siccardi (born 11 April 1984 in La Colle, Monaco) is a Monégasque Olympic judoka who competes in the Men's 60 kg category. He competed in the 2008 and the 2012 Summer Olympics. At the 2008 Summer Olympics, he lost in the first round to Craig Fallon of Great Britain.  At the 2012 Summer Olympics, he was defeated in the third round by Russian Arsen Galstyan. Siccardi won a gold medal in the 60 kg and under category at the 2011 Games of the Small States of Europe. Siccardi qualified for the 2016 Summer Olympics and is the Monégasque flag bearer.

References

External links
 
 

1984 births
Living people
Monegasque male judoka
Olympic judoka of Monaco
Judoka at the 2008 Summer Olympics
Judoka at the 2012 Summer Olympics
Judoka at the 2016 Summer Olympics
Judoka at the 2015 European Games
Mediterranean Games silver medalists for Monaco
Competitors at the 2009 Mediterranean Games
Competitors at the 2018 Mediterranean Games
Mediterranean Games medalists in judo
European Games competitors for Monaco
Judoka at the 2019 European Games